The Madly in Anger with the World Tour was a concert tour by American heavy metal band Metallica. It supported the band's eighth studio album, St. Anger. The tour lasted over 12 months, beginning in the fall of 2003, performing over 100 shows.

Background
After the June 2003 release of St. Anger, Metallica first made some festival and summer stadium appearances as part of the 2003 Tour rubric; those were the first shows to feature new bassist Robert Trujillo. But the full tour did not properly begin until November 6, 2003, starting at Yoyogi National Gymnasium in Tokyo, running through November 28, 2004, concluding at the HP Pavilion in San Jose, California.

Nearly every performance was professionally recorded and sold online. The download series featured each available show in both FLAC and MP3 formats. Drummer Lars Ulrich made a statement advising fans that the series was a continuation of the band's pro-taping stance which was taken in the 1990s.

When Ulrich fell ill before the tour's Download Festival appearance on June 6, 2004, an assortment of temporary fill-ins were recruited, including Slayer's Dave Lombardo, Slipknot's Joey Jordison, and Flemming Larsen, Ulrich's drum technician.

The tour was especially popular in Scandinavia, where stadium dates were held and caused Metallica's entire back catalogue to appear on the record charts.

Opening acts
Godsmack 
Lostprophets 
Slipknot 
The Datsuns 
Vader

Setlist
The following setlist was obtained from the June 13, 2004, concert, held at Olympiastadion in Munich, Germany. It does not represent all concerts for the duration of the tour. 
"Instrumental Sequence" 
"Blackened"
"Fuel"
"For Whom the Bell Tolls"
"Instrumental Sequence" 
"Fade to Black"
"Frantic"
"The Memory Remains"
"Wherever I May Roam"
"Instrumental Sequence"
"St. Anger"
"Sad but True"
"Creeping Death"
"Damage, Inc."
"Harvester of Sorrow"
"Instrumental Sequence"
"Nothing Else Matters"
"Master of Puppets"
"One"
"Enter Sandman"
Encore
"Dyers Eve"
"Seek & Destroy"

Tour dates

Festivals and other miscellaneous performances
This concert was a part of "Big Day Out"
This concert was a part of the "Download Festival"
This concert was a part of "Rock in Rio Rock in Rio Lisboa"
This concert was a part of the "Aerodrome Festival"
This concert was a part of "Rock Werchter"

Cancellations and rescheduled shows

Box office score data

Personnel
 James Hetfield – vocals, rhythm guitar
 Kirk Hammett – lead guitar, backing vocals
 Lars Ulrich – drums
 Robert Trujillo – bass, backing vocals

External links
Official website
Metallica on Tour
Live Metallica

References

2003 concert tours
2004 concert tours
Metallica concert tours